Nic Brown (born 8 March 1996) is an Australian swimmer. He competed in the men's 100 metre butterfly and men’s 200 metre butterfly event at the 2018 FINA World Swimming Championships (25 m), in Hangzhou, China.

References

External links
 

1996 births
Living people
Australian male butterfly swimmers
Place of birth missing (living people)
Universiade medalists in swimming
Universiade silver medalists for Australia
Medalists at the 2015 Summer Universiade